Flanders in Action ( – ViA) is a social and economic action programme for the future of Flanders which was established by the Flemish government on 11 July 2006.

See also
 Flanders
 Flanders Interuniversity Institute of Biotechnology (VIB)
 Flanders Investment and Trade (FIT)
 Flemish Council for Science Policy (VRWB)
 Flemish Energy Agency
 Flemish Institute for Technological Research (VITO)
 GIMV
 Institute for the promotion of Innovation by Science and Technology (IWT)
 Participatiemaatschappij Vlaanderen
 Politics of Flanders
 Science and technology in Flanders
 Technopolis

Flanders